Modern Métis Woman is a Canadian, non-profit, registered charity which provides scholarships to Métis identifying women. The NGO was established in 2017 by Queens University PhD candidate Carleigh Milburn for "womxn" who self-identify as Métis.

The non-profit acknowledges the LGBTQ+ community. The NGO provides Métis women with post-secondary scholarships, and digital spaces for art publications.

Art publication 
Modern Métis Woman hosts digital platforms to represent Indigenous and non-Indigenous artwork. All artwork that is submitted is used for publication and distribution with copyright ownership remaining with the artist. The charity utilizes the artwork to draw attention to scholarship opportunities for Indigenous women in Canada. The charitable organization provides art scholarships that are hosted on Instagram and Facebook.

Scholarships 
Modern Métis Woman provides yearly scholarships to self-identifying Métis women attending post-secondary school in Canada. Financial contributions by the charity for Indigenous women's post-secondary education follows the Truth and Reconciliation Commission of Canada call to action.

Past scholarship winners

References 
 

Non-profit organizations based in Canada
Métis in Canada
Women in Canada